Jampie Kuneman (20 July 1923 – 9 April 2018) was a Dutch footballer. He played in two matches for the Netherlands national football team in 1951.

References

External links
 

1923 births
2018 deaths
Dutch footballers
Netherlands international footballers
Place of birth missing
Association footballers not categorized by position